Marathe (Saste) is an Indian Hindu surname. Notable people with the surname include:

 Anant Marathe (1929–2003), Indian actor
 Deepa Marathe (born 1972), Indian cricketer
 Priya Marathe, Indian actress
 Shruti Marathe (born 1986), Indian actress
 Sushant Marathe (born 1985), Indian cricketer

See also
 Marathi people
 Konkani people

Marathi-language surnames
Indian surnames